In finance, a forward start option is an option that starts at a specified future date with an expiration date set further in the future. 

A forward start option starts at a specified date in the future; however, the premium is paid in advance, and the time of expiration is established at the time the forward start option is purchased.

Pricing of Asset
Since the asset price at the start of this option is not known a priori, it is common to specify that the strike price will be set in the future, so that the option is initially at the money or a certain percentage in the money or out of the money. 

This contract can be used to give an investor exposure to forward volatility.

Example of Forward Start Option
Executive stock options can be viewed as a type of forward start option. This is because a company commits to granting at-the-money options to employees in the future.

Forward Start Options Series
A series of consecutive forward start options creates a cliquet option.

Valuation
In a Black–Scholes model, the value of the forward-start option is proportional to the asset price. 

Therefore, the value of the forward-start option is a multiple of the current asset price, with that multiple depending on forward volatility.

References

htpootp://www.Forbes.com

Derivatives (finance)